Sayyid Abdullah bin Alwi Alatas (1840–1929) was a Dutch East Indies merchant, landlord, and philanthropist of Arab descent from the Ba 'Alawi sada clan. Alatas is also the owner of the Cikini House (now Cikini Hospital) after it was bought from Raden Saleh. He also inherited another eccentric house, such as a house built by a Frenchman in an Islamic style (now a Textile Museum).

Alwi Shahab, a senior Indonesian journalist, also wrote in his book Saudagar Baghdad dari Betawi (2004) that Alatas was the grandfather of Ali Alatas, the former Indonesian Foreign Minister (1998–1999), and Haidar Abu Bakr al-Attas, former Prime Minister of Yemen (1990–1994) and South Yemen (1985–1986).

References

Footnotes

Works cited

Bibliography

External links

 Profile in Ensiklopedi Jakarta

1840 births
1929 deaths
Indonesian landlords
Indonesian people of Yemeni descent
Indonesian Muslims